The Fužine Bridge is a bridge crossing the Ljubljanica River near Fužine Castle in the eastern part of Ljubljana, the capital of Slovenia. It was built in 1987 based on plans by Peter Gabrijelčič, who received the Prešeren Fund Award for it in 1988. It was modelled on bridges by Jože Plečnik.

References

Bridges in Ljubljana
Bridges over the Ljubljanica
Bridges completed in 1987
Road bridges in Slovenia
20th-century architecture in Slovenia